Anolis cupeyalensis, the stripe-bellied grass anole or Cupeyal anole, is a species of lizard in the family Dactyloidae. The species is found in Cuba.

References

Anoles
Reptiles described in 1970
Endemic fauna of Cuba
Reptiles of Cuba